The 2023 Women's U17 European Volleyball Championship will be 4th edition of the Women's U17 European Volleyball Championship, a biennial international volleyball tournament organised by the European Volleyball Confederation (CEV) the girls' under-17 national teams of Europe. The tournament will be held in Serbia and Hungary from 11 to 22 July 2023.

Qualification

Venues

References

External links
Official website

Girls' Youth European Volleyball Championship
Europe
Volleyball
International volleyball competitions hosted by Hungary
International volleyball competitions hosted by Serbia
European Volleyball Championship
European Volleyball Championship
Békéscsaba
2023 in Serbian sport
Volleyball
Volleyball